Primiero is one of the sixteen districts of Trentino in the Italian region of Trentino-Alto Adige/Südtirol.

References 

 

Districts of Trentino
States and territories established in 2006